The Nissan Terra is a mid-size SUV manufactured by Nissan. It was launched to the public at the April 2018 Auto China. The Terra is positioned in size between the X-Trail/Rogue compact crossover and Patrol/Armada full-size SUV. The Terra also fills the position left by the R51 series Pathfinder that sold between 2005 and 2012 and replaces the Paladin in China. The name "Terra" is Latin for "earth".

Overview

Development 
In 2011, when the development of the D23 Navara started, Nissan was considering to develop an SUV based on the Navara as the successor for the Paladin. At the early phase of the development, Nissan executives aimed the car for the growing Chinese and Middle East market. However, the development was halted between 2014 and 2015 as executives were undecided with the new SUV position segment-wise, with the popular X-Trail sitting very close to the aimed segment.

The Terra had been planned to be launched in 2016, however several constraints in its development delayed its launch. In 2015, segment competitors including Toyota Fortuner, Mitsubishi Pajero Sport, and Ford Everest had their new generation launched, which delayed the development in order to evaluate and improve the details of the Terra to be able to compete. The development was also constrained by a new excise tax structure based on emissions introduced by the Thai government, which forced Nissan to engineer the cleaner YS23DDTT diesel engine to the Terra. As a result, the Terra release was delayed by two years. The official details of the vehicle were eventually revealed in 15 March 2018 and was unveiled in the following month.

According to Pedro Deanda, chief product specialist that supervised the development of the vehicle, the Terra shares the front door panels, front hood bonnet and the door handles with the D23 Navara. The chassis and suspension was re-engineered to be shorter for comfort and maneuverability.

Engines 
The engines are mated to a 6-speed manual or 7-speed automatic transmission.

Markets 
On 28 May 2018, the Terra was launched in the Philippines. It gets a 2.5-liter diesel engine option. Compared to the Chinese version, it is  wider,  longer and seats 7 (compared to 5). It is offered in five trim options.

The Terra was launched in Indonesia on 2 August 2018 at the 26th Gaikindo Indonesia International Auto Show. Imported from Thailand, it came with the similar specs as the Philippine version. The import was temporarily suspended between 2020 and 2022 due to low sales. 2,757 units were sold before the import suspension.

The Terra was launched in Thailand on 16 August 2018. It uses the 2.3 L diesel engine option to comply with Thailand excise tax structure. The 2.3 L engine, YS23DDTT produces less CO2 pollution than the 2.5 L YD25DDTi engine, precisely 196 g/km which is lower than the 200 g/km limit regulated by the Thai government to get a 5% tax incentive.

In the Bruneian market, the Terra was launched in early 2019, and offered in Mid, High and Premium models. The Terra comes with only 2.5-litre diesel engine (all trims), 7-speed automatic (High and Premium) or 6-speed manual (Mid), tire-pressure monitoring system (Premium), around-view monitor (Premium), 18-inch rims (High and Premium), 17-inch rims (Mid), hill-descent control (Premium) and 6 airbags for all trims.

The facelifted Terra was launched in GCC markets in November 2020 as the X-Terra. It also underwent a major update on the front fascia, rear fascia, and dashboard design. The GCC market X-Terra is offered in SE, Titanium and Platinum trim levels, all of which are powered by a 2.5-liter QR25DE petrol engine. The facelifted Terra was also launched in Thailand on 19 August 2021. With this facelift, it received upgraded safety and tech. In the Philippines, the facelifted Terra was released on 1 September 2021. In Indonesia, the facelifted Terra was introduced on 11 August 2022 at the 29th Gaikindo Indonesia International Auto Show, after nearly a three-year hiatus, while sales began on 10 March 2023 after being launched at the 2nd Gaikindo Jakarta Auto Week.

Safety

Gallery 
Pre-facelift

Facelift

Sales

References

External links 

  (Philippines)

Terra
Cars introduced in 2018
2020s cars
Mid-size sport utility vehicles
Rear-wheel-drive vehicles
All-wheel-drive vehicles
Off-road vehicles
ASEAN NCAP large off-road
Cars powered by longitudinal 4-cylinder engines